Lạc Thủy is a rural district of Hòa Bình province in the Northwest region of Vietnam. As of 2003, the district had a population of 49,460. The district covers an area of 293 km². The district capital lies at Chi Nê.

References

Districts of Hòa Bình province
Hòa Bình province